The men's triple jump event at the 2015 Asian Athletics Championships was held on June 6.

Results

References

Triple
Triple jump at the Asian Athletics Championships